Uniara was a jagir of Naruka Rajputs, which lie in present-day Rajasthan, India.

History 
The rulers of Uniara are descendants of Rao Bar Singh, the eldest son of Maharaja Udaikaran of Amer. Rao Naru Singh was his grandson, from whom the Naruka clan originated. In 1638 AD, Rao Chandrabhan (1586-1660 AD), eighth in descent from Rao Naru Singh, became the first Rao of Uniara. He received four territories of Uniara, Nagar, Kakor and Banetha.

Wars fought

Siege Of Kandahar 
Rao Chandrabhan showed his chivalry in Kandahar battle, fought in 1606 AD.

Sambhar War 
Rao Raja Sangram Singh, attacked the Mughal forces with his 500 war-trained dogs and 1500 Naruka warriors, which led to the victory of Rajputs against Mughals in the Battle of Sambhar (1708 AD).

Uniara School of painting 

Sangram Singh I, Ajit Singh, Sardar Singh and Bishan Singh, were instrumental in promoting an art form which became known as Uniara art style. It had three distinctive phases. Sardar Singh had at his court three artists, Dhima, Mir Buksh and Kashi, who preferred a style which assimilated elements of Jaipur and Bundi school.

The courts of Bundi and Uniara were linked by marriage, (Sardar Singh's daughter was married to Dalel Singh of Bundi) and perhaps as a result, the painting style of Uniara was strongly influenced by Bundi. The earliest recorded work at Uniara is a Bhagavata Purana of 1759, and it seems that artistic production increased after the Mughal Emperor Shah Alam gave the title of Rao Raja to Sardar Singh the same year.

Architecture  
The Naruka chiefs built forts of Uniara, Kakod, Banetha, Nagar and Newai. All of these forts lies in present-day Tonk, Rajasthan. They built several Hindu temples in their territories. Also, there is a palace belonging to the family in Jaipur, which is now turned into a heritage hotel. The hotel bears the name 'Grand Uniara Heritage Hotel'.

References 

Jagirs
Princely states of Rajasthan
Rajput princely states